The New Hall Manor Estate is the younger of the two major housing estates named after New Hall Manor in Walmley, West Midlands. The other estate is the New Hall Estate. It was built around 2000 and half was built by one company and the other half by another. This caused one half to be called "The Grange" by locals however this is an unofficial name. It was officially named The Avenue. This half is considered the most affluent part of the estate. The houses are larger than the others and house prices can reach £750,000.

Most of the estate is built along Elm Road which then has smaller roads trailing off it. Although most of the houses are designed to a style of contemporary, countryside houses, the space between each house is narrow to meet with requirements. One design of a house can only be used 3 times on the whole estate so repeated designs are infrequent.

The back of the estate is New Hall Valley Country Park (phase 1) and has recently had an addition of playing fields. A walking trail has been added which passes through a small wooded area to Wylde Green Road.

The land on which the estate is situated on used to be farmed as a part of New Hall Farm and New Skipton Farm. Some of the trees have been retained and gates which were once used to separate fields are now used in driveways as ornamental features. The barn and farmhouse of New Skipton Farm were saved from demolition and have been converted into houses, New Hall Farm was Demolished in the 1980s to make way for the New Hall Estate.

Housing estates in Birmingham, West Midlands
Sutton Coldfield